Tiantai Temple, also known as the Temple of Ksitigarbha, is the highest Buddhist temple located on Mount Jiuhua, in Qingyang County, Anhui, China. It was first built in the Tang dynasty (618–907), and went through many changes and repairs through the following dynasties. Most of the present structures in the temple were repaired or built in the late Qing dynasty (1644–1911).

History

Tang dynasty
The original temple dates back to the Tang dynasty (618–907), while Kim Gyo-gak resided in here, where promulgated Buddhist sutras.

Ming dynasty
The temple was first built by monk Zhaolian in 1368, at the dawn of Ming dynasty (1368–1644).

Qing dynasty
In 1720, in the reign of Kangxi Emperor (1662–1722) in the Qing dynasty (1644–1911), monk Chenchenzi settled at the temple and named it "Huomai'an". The modern temple was founded in 1890, in the ruling of Guangxu Emperor (1875–1908).

Republic of China
In 1920 abbot Chede raised funds to built a main hall. Abbot Lantian supervised the construction of stone road in the following year. The temple had reached unprecedented heyday between 1936 and 1949, under the leadership of abbot Yifang.

People's Republic of China
After the establishment of the Communist State in 1949, a modern restoration of the entire temple complex was carried out in 1953 by the Qingyang County Government.

Tiantai Temple has been designated as a National Key Buddhist Temple in Han Chinese Area by the State Council of China in 1983.

Architecture
The existing main buildings include the Shanmen, Four Heavenly Kings Hall, Mahavira Hall, Hall of Guanyin, Dharma Hall, Meditation Hall, and Reception Hall.

Tourism
Tiantai temple is a popular destination for Chinese Buddhists wishing for prosperity in the Chinese New Year. A cable car runs up the mountain and buses run from the Tiantai Scenic Area Bus Stop in Jiuhua township.

References

Bibliography
 

Buddhist temples on Mount Jiuhua
Buildings and structures in Chizhou
Tourist attractions in Chizhou
19th-century establishments in China
19th-century Buddhist temples
Religious buildings and structures completed in 1890